Eupoecila is a genus of scarab beetle family that includes five species, all of which are found in Australia.

References

Cetoniinae